Vikram Misri (born 7 November 1964) is an Indian diplomat who has served as the ambassador of India to China from January 2019 to December 2021. He took over as the Deputy National Security Advisor of India from 1 January 2022, succeeding Pankaj Saran.

Previously, he served as the private secretary to Prime Ministers Inder Kumar Gujral, Manmohan Singh and Narendra Modi, and also as the Indian ambassador to Spain and Myanmar.

Early life and education 
Misri was born on 7 November 1964 in Srinagar, India to a Kashmiri Hindu family. He completed   his early education at the Scindia School. He then completed his undergraduate degree in history from the Hindu College of the University of Delhi. He also completed an MBA at the XLRI –Xavier Labour Relations Institute, Jamshedpur.

Career 
After completing his education, Misri worked for three years in advertising. He joined the Indian Foreign Service in 1989. Between 1991 and 1996, he served in various capacities in the Indian missions in Brussels and Tunis. He was appointed the Private Secretary to Prime Minister Inder Kumar Gujral in 1997. Following this, he had various stints in the Prime Ministers Office and Ministry of External Affairs, as well as several Indian missions abroad.

In 2012, he was appointed the private secretary to Prime Minister Manmohan Singh. He continued to serve in that capacity when Singh was succeeded by Narendra Modi. He was appointed the ambassador to Spain in 2014. He was appointed the ambassador to Myanmar in 2016.

In 2019, he was appointed the ambassador to China. He was ambassador during the 2020–2021 China–India skirmishes and held a series of meetings with senior Chinese officials, including Liu Jianchaou to discuss the tensions.

Personal life 
He is married to Dolly Misri and has two children. He is fluent in English, Hindi, and Kashmiri, and has a working knowledge of French.

References 

Ambassadors of India to China
1964 births
Ambassadors of India to Spain
Ambassadors of India to Myanmar
Living people
Indian Foreign Service officers